Robert John Day (born 13 April 1944) is a former Australian rules footballer who played most of his career in the SANFL with West Adelaide before moving to Victoria to play with Hawthorn in the VFL.

Day was a centreman who started his career with West Adelaide in the SANFL in 1962, making his debut for the club in the Anzac Day "Grand Final Replay" against Norwood at the Adelaide Oval. In 1966 he was named in the All Australian team and was a three time Best & Fairest winner with West Adelaide (1965, 1966 and 1970) and captained the club in his final season (1970). He also represented South Australia 12 times at interstate football.

In 1971 he moved to Victoria and signed with Hawthorn in the VFL. He was a member of that season's premiership team, playing as a half back flanker in Hawthorn's Grand Final win over St Kilda. He was replaced at half time because he was suffering from concussion.

The final years of Day's career was interrupted by injury and he retired having played just 175 games in South Australia and Victoria in 12 seasons.

As of 2013, Day is a board member of the West Adelaide Football Club.

Family
Robert's elder brother Ian Day is a former West Adelaide and South Adelaide player and long time SANFL television commentator and member of the West Adelaide Hall of Fame.

References

External links

1944 births
Living people
Australian rules footballers from South Australia
Hawthorn Football Club players
Hawthorn Football Club Premiership players
West Adelaide Football Club players
All-Australians (1953–1988)
South Australian Football Hall of Fame inductees
One-time VFL/AFL Premiership players